Yarmouth is a town in Barnstable County, Massachusetts, United States, Barnstable County being coextensive with Cape Cod. The population was 25,023 at the 2020 census.

The town is made up of three major villages: South Yarmouth, West Yarmouth, and Yarmouth Port.

History

Wampanoag origins

Prior to European settlement, Yarmouth was inhabited by the Wampanoag, an Algonquian people. In the Wôpanâak language the area was called "Mattacheese". Wampanoag tribes living in Yarmouth at the time of European settlement included the Pawkunnawkuts on both sides of the lower Bass River, the Hokanums in what is now northeastern Yarmouth, and the Cummaquids in what is now western Yarmouth.

Plymouth Colony settlement

Yarmouth was organized and incorporated as part of the Plymouth Colony on September 3, 1639, following a settlement led by John Crowe (later Crowell), Thomas Howes and Anthony Thacher, and is, together with Sandwich, the oldest town on Cape Cod. Yarmouth originally included what is now the town of Dennis, which was incorporated as a separate community on June 19, 1793.

Yarmouth is named after Great Yarmouth, a town in the county of Norfolk, on the east coast of England, which is itself at the mouth of the River Yare. Though none of the initial settlers hailed from that English town, the name was possibly chosen because across the North Sea from Yarmouth is the Netherlands, where a portion of the Mayflower passengers had lived in exile. This group of pilgrims arrived back in England via the port of Yarmouth before heading to the New World.

In 1642 and 1645, Yarmouth furnished soldiers for the Plymouth Colony's expeditions against the Narragansett. In 1648, the Plymouth Colony's legislature, the General Court, appointed Myles Standish to adjudicate land disputes among the Yarmouth settlers. Yarmouth soldiers served the Plymouth Colony in King Philip's War: fifteen Yarmouth men participated in the Great Swamp Fight without casualties, but the town did lose five men at Rehoboth. Yarmouth troops also saw service in the early years of King William's War. In the early eighteenth century, some of the Yarmouth veterans of King Philip's War were granted lands to settle in Gorham, Maine.

American Revolution

Yarmouth was the site of an active group of the Sons of Liberty during the American Revolution. The town's militia mustered to provide assistance to the minutemen at the Battles of Lexington and Concord, but the militia returned home upon news that the rebels had already triumphed on the field. In March 1776, Yarmouth troops served as part of George Washington's forces during the Fortification of Dorchester Heights. A meeting of Yarmouth citizens declared the town's independence from Great Britain on June 20, 1776. As a coastal community, Yarmouth was subject to blockade by the Royal Navy throughout the Revolutionary War.

War of 1812

In the early years of the Republic, Yarmouth shared with the rest of New England a strong support for the Federalist Party. The economy of Yarmouth was centered on maritime industries, and the townspeople were consequently opposed to the Jefferson Administration's Embargo Act of 1807 and Non-Intercourse Act of 1809.

On July 8, 1812, the Yarmouth town meeting voted to protest the recent Congressional declaration of war with Great Britain. Along with much of the rest of coastal New England, Yarmouth was subject to blockade by the Royal Navy beginning in 1814. Although the people of Yarmouth, including its militiamen, remained intensely opposed to the War of 1812, local militia forces did participate in attempts to counter the blockade.

Early economic endeavors

Yarmouth began as a farming community in which the people of the town raised pigs, cattle, and sheep. Due to livestock pasturage, firewood collection, shipbuilding, and the construction of the Old Colony Railroad, the old-growth forests of the Wampanoag era had disappeared from Yarmouth by the end of the nineteenth century, not to be replaced with stands of incipient second-growth forest until agriculture declined in the town during the twentieth century.

Although agriculture was a prominent part of Yarmouth life, the town's location led its people to make much of their living from the ocean. For centuries, many Yarmouth men worked as whalers. In the early nineteenth century, merchantmen skippered by Yarmouth captains participated in the China Trade between New England and the Cantonese trading center of Whampoa. Captain Ebenezer Sears of Yarmouth was the first American skipper to take a merchant vessel around the Cape of Good Hope. In 1854, Captain Asa Eldridge of Yarmouth skippered the clipper Red Jacket, a packet ship, between New York and Liverpool in only 13 days, 1 hour, and 25 minutes, dock to dock, setting a speed record for fastest trans-Atlantic crossing by a commercial sailing vessel that has remained unbroken ever since. In 1856, Captain Eldridge skippered the ill-fated steamship SS Pacific, which disappeared at sea on a voyage from Liverpool to New York. The house of another Yarmouth sea captain, Captain Bangs Hallet, is now a museum and home to the Historical Society of Old Yarmouth.

Contemporary Yarmouth

Developers began to refashion Yarmouth into a summer resort near the end of the nineteenth century. Hotels and summer cottage communities proliferated in the first half of the twentieth century, particularly along what is now Route 28. With the emergence of the car culture in the years just after World War II, these were joined first by many motels (mostly along Route 28 in West Yarmouth) and later by the denser, suburban pattern of residential housing construction that characterizes Yarmouth today.

The headquarters of the International Fund for Animal Welfare (IFAW), a global animal welfare and conservation charity founded in 1969, is located in Yarmouth Port. In 1970, the national Christmas Tree Shops retail chain was founded at a location on Route 6A in Yarmouth Port.

On August 26, 2003, Colgan Air Flight 9446 crashed into the water just off of Yarmouth, killing both crew members on board.

Geography
Yarmouth is bordered by Cape Cod Bay to the north, Dennis to the east, Nantucket Sound to the south, and Barnstable to the west.

The Bass River and its tributaries make up the majority of the town's border with Dennis. There are also several smaller ponds throughout the town. The Cape Cod Bay shore is marshy, with several creeks flowing into it. The town's southern shore is known for its beaches, from the west jetty of the Bass River to Great Island, on the east and south sides of Hyannis Harbor. The town has no state forests or wildlife management areas, although there are many such natural, unprotected areas in town. The town is also the site of four golf courses, a rod and gun club, and a Boy Scout camp.

Climate

According to the Köppen climate classification system, Yarmouth, Massachusetts has a warm-summer, wet all year, humid continental climate (Dfb). Dfb climates are characterized by at least one month having an average mean temperature ≤ 32.0 °F (≤ 0.0 °C), at least four months with an average mean temperature ≥ 50.0 °F (≥ 10.0 °C), all months with an average mean temperature ≤ 71.6 °F (≤ 22.0 °C), and no significant precipitation difference between seasons. The average seasonal (Nov–Apr) snowfall total is around 30 in (76 cm). The average snowiest month is February which corresponds with the annual peak in nor'easter activity. According to the United States Department of Agriculture, the plant hardiness zone is 7a with an average annual extreme minimum air temperature of 0.6 °F (−17.4 °C).

Ecology

According to the A. W. Kuchler U.S. Potential natural vegetation Types, Yarmouth, Massachusetts would primarily contain a Northeastern Oak/Pine (110) vegetation type with a Southern Mixed Forest (26) vegetation form.

Transportation
Cape Cod's three major east–west routes, U.S. Route 6, Massachusetts Route 6A and Massachusetts Route 28, all run through the town. Unlike many towns on the Cape, there are no other state routes crossing between the three roads, with all crossing routes being local roads. There are two exits off Route 6 (also known as the Mid-Cape Highway) in town.

Freight rail service is provided by the Massachusetts Coastal Railroad from the Barnstable town line to just west of Station Avenue south of U.S. Route 6, where a trash transfer station is located. Trash is loaded onto rail cars at the transfer station and hauled to the SEMASS waste-to-energy plant in Rochester. A portion of the Hyannis branch also passes through the western part of Yarmouth. From the nearby Hyannis station, the Cape Cod Central Railroad operates seasonal tourist excursions to Sandwich and Buzzards Bay, and the MBTA's CapeFLYER service offers seasonal weekend service to Boston, with stops in Bourne, Buzzards Bay, Wareham, and several commuter rail stations. The nearest inter-city (Amtrak) passenger rail stations are Boston's South Station and Providence. The nearest MBTA commuter rail stations are Kingston/Route 3 and Middleborough/Lakeville, providing direct service to Boston.

There are also several bike paths throughout town.

The nearest airport is the Barnstable Municipal Airport, just over the town line. The nearest national and international air service is at Logan International Airport in Boston.

Demographics

As of the census of 2000, there were 24,807 people, 11,520 households, and 6,900 families residing in the town. The racial makeup of the town was 95.23% White, 1.34% African American, 0.33% Native American, 0.53% Asian, 0.04% Pacific Islander, 0.94% from other races, and 1.59% from two or more races. Hispanic or Latino of any race were 1.44% of the population.

There were 11,520 households, out of which 19.1% had children under the age of 18 living with them, 47.3% were married couples living together, 9.7% had a female householder with no husband present, and 40.1% were non-families. 34.0% of all households were made up of individuals, and 19.8% had someone living alone who was 65 years of age or older.  The average household size was 2.11 and the average family size was 2.68.

In the town, the population was spread out, with 17.2% under the age of 18, 4.6% from 18 to 24, 23.3% from 25 to 44, 24.7% from 45 to 64, and 30.1% who were 65 years of age or older.  The median age was 49 years. For every 100 females, there were 85.6 males. For every 100 females age 18 and over, there were 80.8 males.

The median income for a household in the town was $39,808, and the median income for a family was $48,148. Males had a median income of $37,090 versus $26,741 for females. The per capita income for the town was $22,731.  About 5.2% of families and 7.5% of the population were below the poverty line, including 11.1% of those under age 18 and 3.6% of those age 65 or over.

Government
Yarmouth is represented in the Massachusetts House of Representatives as a part of the First and Second Barnstable Districts.  The town is represented in the Massachusetts Senate as a part of the Cape and Islands Districts, which includes all of Cape Cod, Martha's Vineyard and Nantucket except the towns of Bourne, Falmouth, Sandwich and a portion of Barnstable.  The town is home to the Second Barracks of Troop D of the Massachusetts State Police.

On the national level, Yarmouth is a part of Massachusetts's 9th congressional district, and is currently represented by William R. Keating.

Yarmouth is governed by the open town meeting form of government, and is led by a town administrator and a board of selectmen. There is a central police station, and one firehouse, post office and library each in South Yarmouth, West Yarmouth and Yarmouth Port.

Education

Yarmouth schools make up one-half of the Dennis-Yarmouth Regional School District. Yarmouth operates two elementary schools (Station Avenue and Marguerite E. Small) which serve students from pre-kindergarten through third grade and the Mattacheese Middle School for grades 6 through 7. Grades 4–5 are served at Wixon Innovative School in Dennis. The town is the home to Dennis-Yarmouth Regional High School, where both towns send their grade 8–12 students. (Unlike most high schools, which are 9–12) Their team colors are green and white, and their mascot is the dolphin.

Students who live in Yarmouth may also attend Cape Cod Regional Technical High School in Harwich or Sturgis Charter Public School in Hyannis; both for grades 9–12. In addition, they may choose to attend Saint Pius X School for grades pre-kindergarten through 8, or any of the other private schools in neighboring Barnstable.

See also
 Taylor-Bray Farm
 Yarmouth–Dennis Red Sox

Notable people

 Asa Eldridge, sea captain
 Edward Gorey, writer and illustrator
 John Gorham, decorated colonial Ranger
 Lot Hall, Justice of the Vermont Supreme Court
 Joseph Eldridge Hamblin, Civil War major general
 Christy Mihos, businessman and politician
 Snow Parker, merchant, judge and politician
 Keith Reed, Major League Baseball outfielder
 Joe Sherman, Major League Baseball pitcher
 Thomas Chandler Thacher, congressman
 George Thatcher, lawyer and statesman

References

Further reading

External links

 Town of Yarmouth official website
 Historical Society of Old Yarmouth
 Yarmouth Town Libraries
 Yarmouth Chamber of Commerce

 
1639 establishments in Massachusetts
Populated coastal places in Massachusetts
Populated places established in 1639
Towns in Barnstable County, Massachusetts
Towns in Massachusetts